Micheal Emmet Urell (November 8, 1844 - September 6, 1910) was an Irish born soldier in the Union Army during the American Civil War.

Biography 
Urell was born in Nenagh, County Tipperary on November 8, 1844. He earned the Medal of Honor for his actions at Bristoe Station whilst fighting as a Private with the 82nd New York Volunteer Infantry. He was promoted to Brevet Major later in the war. Urell served as a Major of the First Battalion of the District of Columbia National Guard throughout of the Spanish-American War. Upon the end of that war he was made Colonel of the Columbia National Guards Second Infantry. Urell was a prominent member of many veterans organizations, serving as Commander-in-chief of the Spanish War Veterans and as a department commander of the Grand Army of the Republic. Urell died in County Cork, Ireland on September 6, 1910, and his body was  exhumed and brought back to America to be buried in Arlington National Cemetery.

Medal of Honor citation 
For gallantry in action on 14 October 1863, while serving with Company E, 82d New York Infantry, in action at Bristoe Station, Virginia. While detailed as Color Bearer; Private Urell was severely wounded.

Date Issued: 6 June 1870

Notes

External links 
 Additional Information
 Portrait by Louis B. Gebhard

References 

1844 births
1910 deaths
Union Army soldiers
American Civil War recipients of the Medal of Honor
Irish-born Medal of Honor recipients
Burials at Arlington National Cemetery
People from County Tipperary
Irish emigrants to the United States (before 1923)
American military personnel of the Spanish–American War